Yisroel Friedman may refer to:

 Yisrael Friedman of Ruzhin, 19th century Jewish leader known as the Ruzhiner Rebbe
 Yisroel Moshe Friedman, the sixth Rebbe of Sadigura dynasty
 Yisroel Friedman (rosh yeshiva), rosh yeshiva of Oholei Torah
 Yisrael Friedman (Pashkaner Rebbe), the Pashkaner Rebbe